This is a list of notable Old Paulines, alumni of St Paul's College, University of Sydney.

Rhodes scholars

1907 Garnet Portus
1908 Richard Waddy
1911 Hugh Ward
1915 Walter Crawford
1920 Vernon Treatt
1925 Allan Callaghan
1931 David Garnsey
1935 Keith Bradfield
1939 Walter Hughes
1940 Basil Travers
1946 William Woodward
1948 Louis Davies
1951 Adrian Henchman
1953 James McLeod
1956 John Bailey
1960 Malcolm Swinburn
1961 David Garnsey
1964 J. Dyson Heydon
1975 Peter King
1990 Andrew Bell
1992 Scott Nixon
1995 Peter Barnett
2001 Andrew Charlton
2003 Benjamin Juratowitch
2007 Eric Knight
2009 Nikolas Kirby
2010 David Llewellyn
2011 Nathaniel Ware

Arts and humanities

Michael Blakemore, actor, writer and theatre director 
Russell Braddon, writer and broadcaster 
Terence Clarke AM, composer and theatre director
Peter Cousens, actor and singer
Thomas Dunbabin, classicist and archaeologist 
Laurie Fitzhardinge, historian and librarian 
Tim Freedman, lead singer of The Whitlams
John Gaden AM, actor
Peter Garnsey, classicist and academic 
H. M. Green, literary historian
James Halliday, wine writer and critic 
Tony Jones, journalist and television presenter
Gavin Long, journalist and military historian
David Marr, biographer and writer
Jock Marshall, writer 
Jonathan Mills, composer and festival director 
David Musgrave, poet 
T. Inglis Moore, writer, anthologist and academic 
Peter Moyes, educator 
Morgan O'Neill, film director, actor, and singer
Dowell O'Reilly, poet, short story writer and politician 
Hamish Rosser, musician
Michael Rubbo, documentary filmmaker 
Garnet Portus, academic
Martin Sharp, artist, cartoonist, songwriter and film-maker
Sebastian Smee, art critic 
Adam Spencer, comedian, media personality and former radio presenter 
Chris Taylor, comedian
Michael White (Made Wijaya), ethnologist and writer

Business
Aslam Azhar, television executive
Warwick Oswald Fairfax, businessman and member of the Fairfax family of media proprietors

Politics and law

John Anderson (b. 1956), former Australian Deputy Prime Minister
Julian Beale (1934–2021), billionaire and former Member for Deakin
Andrew Bell, President of the New South Wales Court of Appeal
John Booth, former Member for Wakehurst
 Sir Nigel Bowen (1911–94), former Federal Court judge, Australian Foreign Minister
Donald Alastair Cameron, Minister for Health and Member for Oxley 
Andrew Charlton, economist and Member for Parramatta
Terence Cole AO RFD QC, former Judge of the Supreme Court of New South Wales
Percy Colquhoun, parliamentarian, lawyer and sportsman 
Nicholas Cowdery AO QC, former Director of Public Prosecutions for NSW
Ernest Docker, judge and cricketer 
Clive Evatt QC, NSW Member of Parliament 
Andrew Gee, Member for Calare
Jack Grahame, lawyer 
Roland Green, Member for Richmond 
Dyson Heydon AC, QC (b 1943), High Court judge
Peter King, former Member for Wentworth
Mark Leeming, Judge of the Court of Appeal of the Supreme Court of New South Wales 
Sandy Macdonald, Former Senator for NSW
Kim Mackay, British politician 
Alan Mansfield KCMG KCVO, 18th Governor of Queensland and barrister
 Sir William McMahon CH (1908–88), former Australian Prime Minister
Leslie Melville, economist, academic and public servant 
John Peden KCMG KC, President of the NSW Legislative Council
Peter Phelps, Member of the New South Wales Legislative Council 
Albert PiddingtonKC (1862–1945), former High Court judge and Royal Commissioner
Robert Pring, judge of the Supreme Court of New South Wales
Andrew Refshauge (b. 1949), former New South Wales Deputy Premier
Thomas Roseby (1867–1929), former Chief Judge of Mauritius
James Rowland, Governor of New South Wales and senior Royal Australian Air Force officer 
John Rowland, diplomat and poet 
Ben Saul, international barrister 
Edward St John, Member for Warringah and barrister 
Sir Kenneth Street (1890–1972), former NSW Chief Justice
Sir Philip Street (1863–1938), former NSW Chief Justice
George Thorn, Member of the Queensland Legislative Assembly and Premier of Queensland 
Robert Tickner (b. 1951), former Australian Minister for Aboriginal and Torres Strait Islander Affairs
Sir Vernon Treatt KBE, MM, QC (1897–1984), Minister for Justice (1938–1941), Leader of the Opposition (1946–1952), and Member for Woollahra
Lloyd Waddy AM, Family Court judge and convenor of Australians for Constitutional Monarchy
Bret Walker AO, SC (b. 1954), Australian barrister
Gough Whitlam AC (1916-2014), former Australian Prime Minister
 Sir Dudley Williams (1889–1962), former High Court judge
William Windeyer (b. 1936), NSW Supreme Court judge
David Yates, Judge of the Federal Court of Australia

Religion
Fortescue Ash, 4th Bishop of Rockhampton
Ernest Burgmann (1885–1967), church leader
George Cranswick, 2nd Bishop of Gippsland 
David Garnsey, Bishop of Gippsland
Max Thomas, bishop
Henry Alexander Woodd, Anglican minister

Science and medicine
Peter Orlebar Bishop, neurophysiologist 
Sir Denis Browne (1892–1967), surgeon
Louis Davies AO (1923–2001), physicist
Ian Constable, ophthalmologist 
Lorimer Dods LVO, paediatrician
Sir Lorimer Dods KB LVO (1900–1981), paediatrician
William Sutherland Dun, palaeontologist
A. P. Elkin CMG (1891–1979), anthropologist
Sir George Halliday KB (1901–1987), surgeon
W. C. B. Harvey CBE (1897–1981), physician
Charles Huxtable, doctor 
Richmond Jeremy OBE (1899–1995), physician
Colin Johnston AO (b.1934), heart researcher
Bruce Kapferer, anthropologist 
Arthur Rex Knight, psychologist 
James Lance AO OBE (b. 1926), neurologist
Colin Laverty, medical practitioner and founder of Laverty Pathology 
Miles Little AO (b.1933), surgeon and ethicist
James May AC (b.1934), pioneering vascular surgeon
Patrick McGorry AO (b.1952), psychiatrist, academic, 2010 Australian of the Year
James McLeod AO (b. 1932), neurologist
Edward Pierson Ramsay, zoologist 
Douglas Reye, pathologist 
Raymond Stalker AO (b.1930), engineer

Sports

Al Baxter (b. 1977), rugby union player with Australian national team
Mark Bethwaite AM, Olympic sailor 
Ed Cowan, Australian Test cricketer
Walter Crawford, first-class cricketer, Governor of Northern Sudan
Tim Davidson, rugby union player 
Frank Futter, rugby union player 
Cameron Girdlestone, 2016 Olympic silver medallist for rowing
Daniel Halangahu, rugby union coach 
Michael Hawker, Australian National Rugby Union player and captain
Mitch Inman, rugby union player 
Jack Massie, cricketer 
Jim Phipps, Australian rules footballer 
Brian Power, Olympic judoka 
Lachlan Renshaw (b. 1987), Olympic and Commonwealth Games track athlete
Claude Tozer, cricketer and medical doctor 
Basil Travers, rugby player and educator
Mick Waddy, cricketer and clergyman 
Robert Waley, Olympic coxswain

References

St. Paul's College, Sydney
 
St Pauls